Heart of Dixie may refer to:
 Heart of Dixie (film), 1989 American film
 Heart of Dixie (mixtape), mixtape by American rapper Yelawolf
 Heart of Dixie Railroad Museum
 "The Heart of Dixie" (song), a 2013 song by Danielle Bradbery
 Heart of Dixie, state nickname of Alabama

See also
 Hart of Dixie, an American television series